Émile-René Ménard (15 April 1862, in Paris – 13 January 1930, in Paris) was a French painter. From early childhood he was immersed in an artistic environment:  Corot, Millet and the Barbizon painters frequented his family home, familiarizing him thus with both landscape and antique subjects.

Biography
Ménard studied at the Académie Julian from 1880 after having been a student of Baudry, Bouguereau, and Henri Lehmann.  He participated in the Salon of the Secession in Munich, and the Salon de la Libre Esthétique in Brussels during 1897.  Several personal exhibitions were also devoted to him at the Georges Small Gallery. In 1904, he was appointed professor at the Académie de la Grande Chaumière, and in that year welcomed the rising young Russian painter Boris Kustodiev, age 26, in his art studio.

In 1921, he exhibited in the Twelfth Salon along with Henri Martin and Edmond Aman-Jean.  Galleries in Buffalo, New York and Boston, Massachusetts exposed Ménard and his art to the United States.  However, the numerous commissions that Ménard received from the French government crowned his career; for example, the cycle for the Hautes Etudes à la Sorbonne, the Faculté de Droit, and the fresco Atoms for the Chemistry institute, and finally the Caise des Dépôts in Marseilles.

Ménard's art allies a rigorous, clear classicism with a diffuse and dreamlike brushwork.  In 1894, Victor Soulier in  L'Art et la Vie described Ménard's work "visions of a pacified, bathed nature, of dawn and of twilight, where the soul seems to immerse itself in the innocence of daybreak, and breathe the divine anointment that comes with the dawn."

References

External links

1861 births
1930 deaths
Painters from Paris
19th-century French painters
Académie Julian alumni
French male painters
20th-century French painters
20th-century French male artists
French Symbolist painters
French portrait painters
Mythological painters
French landscape painters
Animal painters
Officiers of the Légion d'honneur
Burials at Montparnasse Cemetery
19th-century French male artists